Money is a 1991 Canadian-French drama film directed by Steven Hilliard Stern.

The film centers around a young rich man's revenge on his late father's associates who have stolen his inheritance money.

Plot
Frank Cimballi (Eric Stoltz) is a rich 21-year-old who goes to claim his inheritance only to find it has been embezzled by his father's former business partners. Traveling the globe in search of the white-collar thieves who have robbed him of millions, Frank locates his father's seriously ill associate Will Scarlet (F. Murray Abraham), who admits to his role in the crime and agrees to help Frank track down the rest of the men on his revenge list.

Cast
 Eric Stoltz as Frank Cimballi
 Maryam d'Abo as Sarah Wilkins
 Bruno Cremer as Marc Lavater
 Mario Adorf as The Turk
 Anna Kanakis as Anna Lupino
 F. Murray Abraham as Will Scarlett
 Christopher Plummer as Martin Yahl
 Bernard Fresson as Henry Landau
 Angelo Infanti as Romano
 Tomas Milian as Robert Zara

References

External links

1991 films
1991 drama films
Canadian drama films
French drama films
Films shot in Montreal
Films directed by Steven Hilliard Stern
Films scored by Ennio Morricone
1990s business films
Films based on French novels
English-language Canadian films
English-language French films
Films about inheritances
1990s English-language films
1990s Canadian films
1990s French films